The Caius Choirbook is an illuminated choirbook dating to the early sixteenth century and containing music by Tudor-period composers. The book appears to originate from Arundel in Sussex, and to have been created sometime in the late 1520s; the then Master of Arundel College, Edward Higgons, seems to have presented it to the collegiate chapel of Saint Stephen's in Westminster, where he was a canon beginning in 1518. The choirbook is now housed at Gonville and Caius College, Cambridge.

The major contributors to the Caius Choirbook are Robert Fayrfax and Nicholas Ludford; between them they contributed at least eleven of its fifteen pieces. Music by older composers, such as Edmund Stourton and Walter Lambe, may be found in the Lambeth and Eton Choirbooks, but not in the Caius Choirbook. Other composers represented in the Caius Choirbook include William Cornysh, Edmund Turges, and Henry Prentes. There is in addition a Mass by William Pasche, based upon Christus resurgens, a processional antiphon for Easter.

References
HOASM.org
Digital Image Archive of Medieval Music

Notes

External links 

 Playlist of available works from the Caius Choirbook on Spotify

16th-century books
16th-century illuminated manuscripts
Music illuminated manuscripts
Renaissance music
Gonville and Caius College, Cambridge
Manuscripts in Cambridge
Books on English music
Renaissance music manuscript sources